Horozköy can refer to:

 Horozköy, Aydın
 Horozköy, Yeşilova
 Horozköy railway station